The Storr is a rocky hill on the Trotternish peninsula of the Isle of Skye in Scotland. The hill presents a steep rocky eastern face overlooking the Sound of Raasay, contrasting with gentler grassy slopes to the west.

Geology
The Storr is a prime example of the Trotternish landslip, the longest such feature in Great Britain. It is the type locality for the mineral gyrolite.

The area in front of the cliffs of the Storr is known as the Sanctuary. This has a number of weirdly shaped rock pinnacles, the remnants of ancient landslips.

Ascent routes
A well-constructed path, used by many sightseers, leaves the A855 just north of Loch Leathan. It heads up through a clearfell area that was formerly a conifer plantation. Most day-trippers are content simply to wander around the Sanctuary, admiring the pinnacles and gazing up at the Storr's eastern cliffs. Walkers can easily ascend to the summit, however, by skirting below the cliffs whilst heading north from the north end of the Sanctuary. After passing over a fence at a makeshift stile and climbing a brief steep section of loose rock, the recommended route for walkers heads north-west as far as Coire Scamadal, 1 km north of the summit, then doubles back and heads southwards along the north side, climbing towards the summit. From this route, visible breaks in the cliffs offer tempting short cuts, but these are steep, may not save time and may not be safe. An alternative route, involving some mild scrambling, follows the rim of the south-east-facing cliffs from the top of the aforementioned steep section.

A steep section of this course is slippery and requires care.

The Storr is often climbed as part of a much longer expedition, following the full length of the Trotternish landslip.

Media and the arts
From 1 August to 17 September 2005 one of Britain's single largest environmental artworks was staged on the walk up to Coire Faoin at the base of the Old Man of Storr and the Storr cliffs. Created by NVA, a Scottish environmental arts company, directed by Angus Farquhar (formerly of Test Dept) and designed by a team including "<slight>" and David Bryant from Midnight Design, the work contained music by Geir Jenssen, Paul Mounsey, live performance by Gaelic singer Anne Martin and recordings of the works of Gaelic poet Somhairle MacGill-Eain (Sorley MacLean).  This was David Bryant's last major environmental creative work as he died from cancer in 2007. He won a Plasa Lighting Design award in 2006 for his work lighting the Storr.

In October 2009, a photograph taken of the pinnacles looking towards Raasay and South Rona won the "Take a view: Landscape photo of the year 2009".

In January 2012, production of the science-fiction film Prometheus moved to the Isle of Skye, with filming taking place at the Old Man of Storr.

British composer Matthew Taylor composed the orchestral piece Storr, which takes its name and inspiration from the rock formation, which the composer found awe-inspiring on a visit there. Storr was commissioned and premièred by the Essex Symphony Orchestra conducted by Tom Hammond, and given its London première by the Kensington Symphony Orchestra and Russell Keable on 24 June 2013.

Gallery

References

 The Corbetts and Other Scottish Hills. Scottish Mountaineering Club and Trust.

External links

 The 2005 art installation - from The Guardian
 Images of illumination of landscape
 Isle of Skye Walks
 En Español por ViajaporLibre

Grahams
Marilyns of Scotland
Mountains and hills of the Isle of Skye
Geological type localities of Scotland
Geological type localities